William Montgomery (1885 – 21 November 1953) was a Scottish professional footballer who played as an inside forward for clubs including Sunderland, Oldham Athletic (where he was a member of the club's first campaign in the top tier of English football in 1910–11), Rangers (winning the Glasgow Cup and contributing to a Scottish Football League title in a spell of just a few months at Ibrox Stadium) Dundee and Ayr United.

References

1885 births
1953 deaths
People from Gourock
Scottish footballers
Association football inside forwards
Kilwinning Rangers F.C. players
Rutherglen Glencairn F.C. players
Bradford City A.F.C. players
Sunderland A.F.C. players
Oldham Athletic A.F.C. players
Rangers F.C. players
Dundee F.C. players
Ayr United F.C. players
English Football League players
Footballers from Inverclyde
Scottish Football League players
Scottish Junior Football Association players
Scottish emigrants to the United States